RUTUBE is a Russian video platform. It includes a library of licensed content including movies, series, cartoons, shows, and live broadcasts. It also hosts blogs, podcasts, game streams, and educational content. 

RUTUBE has web, iOS, Android and Smart TV versions. Its audience increased from 7.7 million in January 2022 to over 50 million in March 2022.

Service model 

RUTUBE offers free access to content and gains profit through advertising.

All downloaded content is checked by moderators to block anything that is pornographic, insulting, spam, advocates drug use or violence, or is otherwise abusive and in violation of established rules. The platform uses Content ID for copyright protection. 

Since 2007, the service has supported built-in media players and creation of whole-scale sections on third-party websites via an API. To ensure the posting of legal content, the platform uses a widget which enables navigation by release, season, and episode for TV shows and series. As part of an affiliate program, RUTUBE shares income from advertisements with the owners of resources who host the player.

History

Incorporation of the service and search for investors, 2006–2007 
RUTUBE was launched by Oleg Volobuyev and Mikhail Paulkin—entrepreneurs from Oryol and co-owners of a popular multiplayer browser online game based on Dozory, a franchise of novels and short stories by Sergey Lukiyanenko. In an interview with the Business Journal and the iTV channel, the founders said that they had been working on the video service since 2004–2005. Mr. Volobuyev said that the I-vision.ru service, which they had developed, was an ActiveX-based browser plugin supporting p2p video chats and streams and could capture videos from devices connected to a (personal computer) PC and process those on the client side. He said that ActiveX control elements created a risk of malware infiltration, so the team had to switch to Flash Video. By the time, YouTube, a US video hosting service, had gained popularity, and the Russian developers characterized their service as Russian YouTube. RUTUBE received the status of a video hosting service in 2006.

In 2007, the founders employed Askar Tuganbayev as the producer of RUTUBE; previously, he had managed ATB Internet projects and worked as a producer at O2TV and Gameland TV. While staying in Moscow, Tuganbayev built relationships with partners and looked for an investor for the company. RUTUBE attracted some private investors, Mangrove Capital Partners Venture Fund and Gazprom Media Group, which was entering the Internet market. Negotiation with Gazprom-Media started in summer of 2007, and legal arrangements lasted from March 2008 through November 2008. Speculations on the deal's size stirred up public interest. The Kommersant claimed that the 100 percent capital of the company ranged from $5 mln to $15 mln; in an interview with the Vedomosti, Dmitry Grishin, German Klimenko, and Viktor Lavrenko suggested $5 mln to $10 mln, $3 mln to $5 mln, and $1 mln respectively. In summer 2008, the Kommersant stated that the RUTUBE control stake had been acquired at $15 mln in total, and that the founders had received motivation payments.

Ownership by Gazprom Media 2008–2012 
At the stage of arrangements, Tuganbayev had to leave the company due to the expiry of his annual contract. The end of the deal was marked with a major staff reshuffle. Developers and systemic administrators were moved to a separate company, and the holding passed technical development and video hosting support over to it. RUTUBE hired media managers, set up a commercial service, designers, and editors, whose responsibility was choosing topics for materials. Former head of the department of management of TNT-owned channels—Mikhail Ilyochov—took up the position of Chief Executive Officer. Vladimir Barabanov, former corporate director of the Hurst Shkulyov Media Publishing House, was appointed as Chief Development Officer. The changes fitted with RUTUBE's new development strategy of a socially-oriented platform.

In October 2010, the RUTUBE player was integrated into VKontakte. In April next year, a section was added to Odnoklassniki with the video platform's content, and ad campaigns were launched in September. Also, in September 2011, paid video content was added—live Russian Football League streams maintained in cooperation with NTV-Plus, a satellite TV provider. In October, the user stream service, which had worked since the launch of the platform, stopped working. 

In March 2011, under the supervision of the RUTUBE managerial staff, the Now.ru online movie theater was launched in the service's technical base, whose library included licensed content provided by Sony Pictures, The Walt Disney Company, Warner Bros., Playboy, Lionsgate, BBC, MTV and Nickelodeon.

In spring 2011, a dedication ceremony on the platform's servers was held by a Russian Orthodox priest, Father Victor, upon the request of Yury Degtyaryov, General Producer of RUTUBE, captured the attention of mass media. It was reported that the service was going to get blessings from the Council of Muftis and the Chief Rabbi of Russia.

Redesign and development, 2012–2015 
In summer 2012, Gazprom Media changed the service's management. At the same time, changes were made to the design, development strategy, and marketing strategy. In the new version, RUTUBE formed a personified home page based on the social graph of a Facebook (and later VKontakte) profile while offering videos posted on RUTUBE and social media and published on other platforms—YouTube and Vimeo. Maxim Ilyichov was replaced by Now.ru Technical Manager Elena Sakharova, who had managed development of Gazprom Media IT broadcast platforms. The service's content management policy shifted from user materials toward editor-managed professional content. In August, RUTUBE demonstrated French movies, short movies, and advertisement videos, which had received Cannes Lions awards.

In 2014, the company planned to change its stockholder structure as part of a deal between Rostelekom and Gazprom Media. It was expected that RUTUBE would merge with Zoomby.ru, a platform specializing in TV content and movie-oriented Now.ru, under a single brand. The deal was approved by the Federal Antimonopoly Service, but it was canceled after the Gazprom Media reshuffle.
In February 2015, RUTUBE partnered with Sputnik.Deti, a search engine for children, when it presented videos from the secure children's section in search results. In June, the content appeared in a separate section of V Metro, as part of RUTUBE's cooperation with the MaximaTelecom Wi-Fi network of the Moscow Metro. In July, former CEO of Groupon in Russia and Ukraine—Vadim Fedotov—became CEO of RUTUBE and took control of Gazprom Media assets. In October, RUTUBE content appeared on the updated Kinopoisk service.

Merger with Pladform, 2016–2019 
In February 2016, it was announced that RUTUBE was merging with Pladform (Runet's largest legal content distributor), via which videos are posted on Russian online platforms, including VKontakte. In May that year, the merger procedure was completed. Gazprom Media passed over to the new company—Ruform—the RUTUBE brand and the rutube.ru website, while reserving the CDN network and ZAO Rutube transcoding resources. In the new group, Gazprom Media holds a 33.3% stock, and the rest of it belongs to previous Pladform stockholders—Armen Gulinyan, Ivan Tavrin, and Innova. Armen Gulinyan, founder and CEO of Pladform, took the position of CEO at Ruform, and head of a digital subholding at Gazprom Media—Vadim Fedotov—became chairman of the board of directors. In January 2019, Ivan Tavrin and his partners sold 67% of the OOO Ruform Stock to Alexander Karmanov—the main owner of Eurasian Pipeline Consortium. Roman Maximov was appointed as CEO.

Operating as part of LIST, 2019–2020 
Since late 2019, RUTUBE worked as part of the LIST platform, which provided free access to content on the condition that a user watched ads and answered two questions: one concerning promo content and the other—the audience's interests, to investigate users' needs. 

The system relied on free access to the content at the cost of having to watch ads carefully and to the end.

All videos hosted by the service would be available after a free sign-up via phone number. 

The service would host Movies and Series rather than UGC. All projects by Premier, TNT, Pyatnitsa!, and other major Russian TV channels were available for free. 

The "closed" approach resulted in the deletion of the RUTUBE player from major platforms like VKontakte and Odnoklassniki.

Merger with Gazprom Media, 2020–present 
In late 2020, news emerged that Gazprom Media planned to purchase RUTUBE's controlling stock and to monopolize ownership of the video-hosting platform. On December 28, 2020, the information proved correct: Gazprom Media became the sole owner of OOO Ruform (a company which includes RUTUBE and Pladform) and was planning to carry on with the team. The size of the deal became public. 

In late December 2020, RUTUBE canceled mandatory sign-up for those planning to confine their activities to watching videos. Users wanting to comment or to post their own videos would need to sign up via email, not via phone number. Also, RUTUBE switched back to the classic monetization model - relying on free video-streaming with mandatory ad-viewing. The polling system was canceled.

In April, RUTUBE was relaunched. The changes influenced the web version: which featured a completely new interface, intuitive navigation, a new color-palette, and new content-management tools.

The site added new sections: "Podcasts", "Tuition", and "Goods". Also, new monetization tools appeared: donations, subscriptions, and live online-sales. 

In August 2021, Alexey Nazarov, former ER-Telecom top-manager, replaced Roman Maximov as the new CEO of Rutube. Nazarov's main tasks include further upgrade, and increasing users and traffic, as well as strategic and operational management.

A large-scale cyberattack forced the video platform offline, hours before the scheduled streaming of the Moscow 9 May  Victory Day parade. It turned out that the platform security audit was outsourced to Ukrainian company, which used a purposely left backdoor to wipe most of its content and install Ukrainian propaganda.

In July 2022, two Russian pranksters, Vovan and Lexus, arranged fake interviews, luring a number of European politicians to speak with their impersonation of the Kyiv mayor Vitali Klitschko. Via Zoom, they used old videos of Klitschko to speak with Berlin mayor Franziska Giffey, EU-commissioner Ylva Johansson and other politicians. The pranksters claimed in an interview with the German RBB that Rutube financed them.

See also 
 Comparison of video services
 YouTube

References

External links
 Official website

Internet properties established in 2006
Russian entertainment websites
Transactional video on demand
Video game streaming services
Video hosting